Lembocarpus is a genus of flowering plants belonging to the family Gesneriaceae.

Its native range is Guianas.

Species:
 Lembocarpus amoenus Leeuwenb.

References

Gesnerioideae
Gesneriaceae genera